Płonica may refer to the following places in Poland:
Płonica, Lower Silesian Voivodeship (south-west Poland)
Płonica, Lubusz Voivodeship (west Poland)
Płonica, Pomeranian Voivodeship (north Poland)